Chapter 3 is the third studio album by German girl group Queensberry. It was released by Orange Red Music, and Universal Music on 22 June 2012 in German-speaking Europe, marking the band's first album featuring new member Ronja Hilbig after her replacement of original band members Antonella Trapani and Victoria Ulbrich.

Track listing

Notes 
 denotes co-producer
 denotes additional producer

Charts

Release history

References

External links
 Official website

2012 albums
Warner Music Group albums